is a Japanese voice actor affiliated with Stardust Promotion. He is known for his roles as Cestvs in Cestvs: The Roman Fighter and Yatora Yaguchi in Blue Period.

Biography
Hiromu Mineta was born in Yamagata Prefecture on June 24, 1995. Before working as a voice actor, he did cosplaying, including recreating the cover of Maid Sama! with Nogizaka46's Minami Hoshino to celebrate the release of the series' 16th volume. In 2021, Mineta received his first lead role, Cestvs in Cestvs: The Roman Fighter. He also voiced the main protagonist Yatora Yaguchi in the anime adaptation of Blue Period.

Filmography

Animated series
2016
 Orange as Nakayama
2017
 Seiren as School boy
 Code: Realize − Guardian of Rebirth as Soldier
2018
 How to Keep a Mummy as Tanaka 
 Tokyo Ghoul: Re as Toma Higemaru
2021
 Cestvs: The Roman Fighter as Cestvs
 Star Wars: Visions as Ethan
 Blue Period as Yatora Yaguchi
2022
 Futsal Boys!!!!! as Louis Kashiragi
2023
 Giant Beasts of Ars as Meran
 Technoroid Overmind as Kei

Video games
2020
 Project Sekai: Colorful Stage! feat. Hatsune Miku as Koutaro Mita
TBA
Futsal Boys!!!!! High-Five League as Louis Kashiragi

Other
2014
 Gurren Lagann stage play as Viral
2020
 Ayakashi Triangle vomic as Matsuri Kazamaki

References

External links
 Official agency profile 
 

1995 births
Living people
Cosplayers
Japanese male video game actors
Japanese male voice actors
Male voice actors from Yamagata Prefecture
Stardust Promotion artists